George Allen Ross (October 24, 1878 – January 21, 1946) was a Canadian architect, for many years senior partner in the important Montreal firm of Ross and Macdonald.

Life
Born in Montreal on October 24, 1878, Ross was educated at the High School of Montreal, the Massachusetts Institute of Technology in Cambridge, Massachusetts, and the École des Beaux-Arts in Paris.

After returning from Paris, Ross was apprenticed to Brown, MacVicar, & Heriot in Montreal and later become a draftsman for the Grand Trunk Railway. He also worked for Parker & Thomas in Boston and Carrere & Hastings in New York City, then in 1907 went into partnership in Montreal with David MacFarlane as Ross and MacFarlane. When MacFarlane withdrew from the firm in 1912, Ross established a new partnership with Robert Henry Macdonald called Ross and Macdonald.

He died at his home in Montreal on January 21, 1946.

Honours
Fellow of the Royal Architectural Institute of Canada
Associate of the Royal Institute of British Architects, 1904
Fellow of the Royal Institute of British Architects, 1913
President of the Quebec Association of Architects

Notable buildings

References

External links
Ross, George Allen ~ career outline at magma.ca
Le fantasme métropolitain : l'architecture de Ross et Macdonald : bureaux, magasins et hôtels 1905‑1942
George Allen Ross, Biography at mcgill.ca (McGill University)

Canadian architects
High School of Montreal alumni
1878 births
1946 deaths
Associates of the Royal Institute of British Architects
Canadian expatriates in the United States